Buford Highway can mean:

Georgia State Route 13 in DeKalb County
Georgia State Route 20 in Forsyth County